Gouffre Jean-Bernard or Réseau Jean Bernard, sometimes known simply as Jean Bernard, is one of the deepest caves known in the world. It is in the Alps in Samoëns, France. The first entrance to the cave was found by the French caving group Groupe Vulcain in 1963. More entrances have been found over the years since, and currently at least thirteen are known. The cave is named after Jean Dupont and Bernard Raffy, two Groupe Vulcain members who died in 1963 in an unrelated expedition.

Exploration 
Exploration of the cave began shortly after discovery in 1963. At that point, further exploration was blocked by a water-filled tunnel.

Subsequently, another entrance was discovered that had passages that bypassed the flooded tunnel. The cave was explored to  before again becoming blocked, this time by fallen rocks.

See also 
 List of caves
 Speleology
 List of deepest caves

References 

Landforms of Haute-Savoie
Jean-Bernard